Saint-Hugues is a town in southwestern Quebec north northeast of St-Hyacinthe, with a 2006 population of 1,310. It is located along Quebec Route 224, halfway between Saint-Guillaume and Saint-Simon-de-Bagot.

History
In 1827 Saint-Hugues was created as a village, later to be incorporated into the county of Bagot.

Demographics

Population

Language

See also
 List of municipalities in Quebec
 Municipal reorganization in Quebec

References

Municipalities in Quebec
Incorporated places in Les Maskoutains Regional County Municipality